Chantry House can refer to many British buildings which were formerly associated with a chantry, including:

Chantry House, Bunbury, chantry house in Bunbury, Cheshire
Chantry House, Disley, Cheshire; see Listed buildings in Disley
Chantry House, Henley-on-Thames, chantry house in Henley-on-Thames
Sacred Heart Primary School, Teddington
Stoke sub Hamdon Priory, chantry college in Somerset
Wyggeston's Chantry House, now part of Newarke Houses Museum, Leicester

Other uses
Chantry House, an 1886 novel by Charlotte Mary Yonge; see Charlotte Mary Yonge bibliography